Subsonic may refer to:

Motion through a medium
 Any speed lower than the speed of sound within a sound-propagating medium
 Subsonic aircraft, a flying machine that flies at air speeds lower than the speed of sound
 Subsonic ammunition, a type of bullet designed to avoid creating a loud shockwave when fired
 Subsonic flight, an aircraft flight at air speeds lower than the speed of sound in air
 Subsonic and transonic wind tunnels

Music
 Subsonic (album), a 2002 album by Vigleik Storaas Trio
 Subsonic (EP), a 2013 EP by Younha
 Subsonic album series:
 Subsonic 2: Bass Terror, a 1995 album by Bill Laswell and Nicholas Bullen
 Subsonic 3: Skinner's Black Laboratories, a 1995 album by Andy Hawkins and Justin Broadrick
 Subsonic Music Festival, an annual electronic music festival in Monkerai, Australia

See also
 Infrasound, sound at frequencies below the normal threshold of human hearing